The Federation of German Marksmen 1975 (registered association), German Bund Deutscher Sportschützen (BDS), is the second largest shooting sports association in Germany after the German Shooting and Archery Federation. Primarily it promotes sport shooting using firearms and as such small and big bore pistols, revolvers, rifles and shotguns. The BDS is the largest sport shooting association for licensed gun owners in Germany. As of 2020 there are about 80 000 individual members in 2.500 clubs. BDS is also the regional representative of IPSC in Germany.

See also 
 IPSC German Rifle Championship

External links 
 Official homepage of Bund Deutscher Sportschützen
International Practical Shooting Confederation

References 

Regions of the International Practical Shooting Confederation
Sports organisations of Germany